Mae Waen is a tambon (subdistrict) of Phrao District, in Chiang Mai Province, Thailand. In 2005 it had a population of 5,517. The tambon contains 11 villages.

References

Tambon of Chiang Mai province
Populated places in Chiang Mai province